Guillermo Landa y Escandón (2 May 1842 - 1 March 1927) was a Mexican politician and businessman. He was governor of the Federal District of Mexico. He was one of the Científicos. He studied at Stonyhurst College from 1858 to 1862. He is a great-great-grandparent of actress Rose Leslie and attorney Alexander Clark.

References 

1842 births
1927 deaths
Mexican businesspeople
Heads of Government of Mexico City